The Pacific Community's Centre for Pacific Crops and Trees (CePaCT), formerly known as the Regional Germplasm Centre (RGC), is a propagation material vault operated by the Pacific Community (SPC)'s Land Resources Division. Its purpose is to preserve resources including crops, and other plants of the Pacific region. The vault is in Fiji, and it replaced many local seed vaults of the Pacific that had trouble with maintenance.

This center is vested in using cutting edge plant cryopreservation, and propagation methods.

See also
 Germplasm
 International Treaty on Plant Genetic Resources for Food and Agriculture
 Svalbard Global Seed Vault
 Seed saving

References

 
 
 
 
 

Gene banks
Seed associations
Rare breed conservation
Natural resources organizations
Disaster preparedness
Agricultural organisations based in Fiji